Snake Creek may refer to:

Snake Creek, Oklahoma, a census-designated place in Mayes County
Snake Creek (Cadosia Creek tributary), a river in New York
Snake Creek (Susquehanna River), a tributary of the Susquehanna River in Pennsylvania and New York
Snake Creek (Grand River), a stream in South Dakota
Snake Creek (James River), a stream in South Dakota
Snake Creek (Missouri River), a stream in South Dakota
Snake Creek (South Fork Grand River), a stream in South Dakota
Snake Creek (Tennessee River tributary), a stream in Tennessee
Snake Creek, a stream in Utah

See also

Snake Creek Formation, a geologic formation in Nebraska
Snake Creek Farm Historic District, near Hillsville, Virginia
Snake River (disambiguation)